Gina Regland-Sigstad (September 16, 1927 – October 5, 2015) was a Norwegian cross-country skier who competed in the 1950s. She finished tenth in the 10 km event at the 1952 Winter Olympics in Oslo.

Cross-country skiing results

Olympic Games

World Championships

References

External links
Article on Sigstad 

1927 births
2015 deaths
Cross-country skiers at the 1952 Winter Olympics
Cross-country skiers at the 1956 Winter Olympics
Norwegian female cross-country skiers
Olympic cross-country skiers of Norway